The Tsilhqotʼin National Government (TNG), is the official First Nations government (tribal council) serving the Tsilhqotʼin Nation. Their office is located in Williams Lake, British Columbia, Canada. The member communities represented by TNG are ʔEsdilagh, Tsi Del Del, Yunesitʼin, Tlʼetinqox, Xeni Gwetʼin, and Tlʼesqox. Tlʼesqox also belongs to the Carrier-Chilcotin Tribal Council, as does Ulkatcho - a community with both Dakelh (Carrier) & Tsilhqotʼin heritage. TNG was established in 1989.

Departments

Stewardship
Employment
Health
Fisheries
Language & Education
Administration

Member communities

ʔEsdilagh (Alexandria, BC)
Tsi Del Del (Redstone, BC – AKA Alexis Creek First Nation)
Yunesitʼin (Stone – Hanceville, BC)
Tl'etinqox (Anaham – Alexis Creek, BC)
Xeni Gwetʼin (Nemiah Valley, BC)
Tlʼesqox (Toosey – Riske Creek, BC)

Old logo

See also

Tsilhqotʼin
Tsilhqotʼin Nation v British Columbia
Chilcotin language
Chilcotin War
Klattasine
Carrier-Chilcotin Tribal Council
List of tribal councils in British Columbia

External links
Tsilhqotʼin National Government homepage
Tsilhqotʼin National Government BC Ministry of Aboriginal Relations and Reconciliation infopage

First Nations tribal councils in British Columbia
Tsilhqot'in governments
1989 establishments in British Columbia